Deborah Prothrow-Stith, M.D. is Dean and Professor at Charles R. Drew University College of Medicine in Los Angeles, CA, and is widely recognized for her leadership in the field of public health.

Prothrow-Stith has advised top-tier healthcare institutions on leadership, as a principal at consulting firm Spencer Stuart, and she served as the Henry Pickering Walcott Professor of Public Health Practice and Associate Dean for Diversity at Harvard School of Public Health. At Harvard, she created the Division of Public Health Practice and secured over $14 million in grant funding for health programs. While working in inner-city Boston, she broke new ground with efforts to define youth violence as a health problem. She developed The Violence Prevention Curriculum for Adolescents, a forerunner of violence prevention curricula for schools, and authored or co-authored several books: Deadly Consequences (HarperCollins 1991); Murder Is No Accident (Jossey Bass Publishers, 2004); Sugar and Spice and No Longer Nice, (Jossey Bass Publishers, 2005); a high school textbook, Health (Pearson 2014); and over 100 articles. In 1987, Governor Michael Dukakis appointed her Commissioner of Public Health for Massachusetts where she led a department with 3,500 employees, 8 hospitals and a budget of $350 million. She and her family lived in Tanzania during her husband’s tenure as U.S. Ambassador. Dr. Prothrow-Stith is a graduate of Spelman College and Harvard Medical School and a diplomate of the American Board of Internal Medicine. In 2003, she was elected to the prestigious National Academy of Medicine. She has received ten honorary doctorates, and in 2017 she was named Woman of the Year for the 2nd District by the LA County Board of Supervisors.

Early life

Prothrow-Stith was born On February 6, 1954 in Marshall, Texas to Percy and Mildred Prothrow but was primary raised in middle-class Atlanta, GA.  Her father, Percy, worked for Atlanta Life, then one of two black-owned insurance companies in the South.  She finished high school in Houston, Texas attending Jack Yates Sr. High.  Though actively recruited by several ivy-league universities, she chose Spelman College in Atlanta, Georgia, for her undergraduate education and earned a degree in mathematics. Following her graduation from Spelman in 1975, she obtained an M.D. from Harvard University Medical School in 1979.

Career

Dr. Prothrow-Stith is a nationally recognized public health leader. As a physician working in inner-city Boston, she broke new ground with her efforts to have youth violence defined as a public health problem, not just a criminal justice issue. Her passion for prevention was not satisfied with the emergency room work of "stitching people up and sending them out." She turned to public health and, with others, created a social movement to prevent violence that has affected Boston and the nation.

After completing her medical residency in 1982, Dr. Prothrow-Stith began to analyze violence as a health problem and determined that the best way to address the issue was by applying a public educational strategy, as has been done to reduce cigarette smoking and drunk driving. She has appeared on numerous nationally broadcast TV and radio programs and in print, explaining how families, schools, and communities can rein in the problem. Today, her Violence Prevention Curriculum for Adolescents is used in schools in all fifty states and abroad. Shortly after her residency, she took a teaching position at Boston University School of Medicine and became a staff physician at Boston City Hospital. She began to devote clinical hours to the Adolescent Clinic of the Harvard Street Neighborhood Health Center in Dorchester, a low-income section of Boston. From 1982 to 1996 (taking a sabbatical from 1987 to 1990), she treated teenagers for everything from sore throats to pregnancies, drug abuse and suicide attempts.

In 1987, Governor Michael Dukakis appointed her as the first woman Commissioner of Public Health for the Commonwealth of Massachusetts (the Massachusetts Department of Public Health). During her term as Commissioner, she established the first Office of Violence Prevention in a state department of public health, expanded prevention programs for HIV/AIDS and increased drug treatment and rehabilitation programs.

In 1991, she published Deadly Consequences: How Violence Is Destroying Our Teenage Population and a Plan to Begin Solving the Problem, which was the first literary work to present violence from a public health perspective to a mass audience. In 1995, President Bill Clinton appointed her to the National Commission on Crime Control and Prevention.

Some publications

Prothrow-Stith, D., et al. (1987). “The Violence Prevention Project: A Public Health Approach.” Science, Technology, & Human Values, vol. 12, no. 3/4, pp. 67–69. JSTOR

Prothrow-Stith, D., Spivak, H.R. (2004) "Murder is no accident: Understanding and preventing youth violence in America." Jossey-Bass. 
Prothrow-Stith, D., Weissman, M. (1991) "Deadly consequences: How Violence Is Destroying Our Teenage Population and a Plan to Begin Solving the Problem." HarperCollins New York.

Personal life
Dr. Prothrow-Stith is married to Boston University professor and U.S. Ambassador, Charles Richard Stith

Awards
 Secretary of Health and Human Services Exceptional Achievement in Public Service Award (1989, Louis W. Sullivan) 
 American Psychiatric Association's Solomon Carter Fuller Award (1998)
 World Health Day Award (1993)
 10 honorary doctorates

References

External links
Deborah Prothrow-Stith: Harvard University links to her publications & links concerning Harvard Youth Violence Prevention Center

Harvard Medical School alumni
African-American academics
African-American educators
American educators
1954 births
Spelman College alumni
Living people
American public health doctors
Academics from Texas
African-American women physicians
African-American physicians
Members of the National Academy of Medicine
Women public health doctors